"The Engagement" is the first episode of the seventh-season and the 111th overall episode of the NBC sitcom Seinfeld. The episode broke with the standalone story format of earlier seasons, making a major change in the series status quo by having regular cast member George Costanza become engaged to Susan Ross. Susan was a recurring character during season 4 of the series but had not been seen since. The episode aired on September 21, 1995.

Plot
George breaks up with a woman named Alice after she beats him in a game of chess. When he tells Jerry about it at Monk's, they both realize that they have done nothing with their lives and decide to make some changes. However, Kramer warns Jerry against marriage, so he decides to remain with his singles lifestyle. George, meanwhile, proposes to his old girlfriend Susan Ross. George is irritated when Jerry tells him that he broke up with his girlfriend Melanie because she eats peas one at a time, arguing that they had a pact to change their lives. He begins to regret his engagement as he has to pass up opportunities to see action films and baseball games with Jerry in order to watch sentimental films and Mad About You with Susan.

A barking dog is keeping Elaine from getting sleep. Kramer refers her to Newman, who agrees to kidnap the dog and relocate it. Later that night, Elaine, Kramer and Newman rent a van and steal the dog, a Yorkshire Terrier. Kramer leaves the dog at a random doorstep in Monticello, but it rips off a piece of his shirt with a tag from Rudy's vintage shop. The dog finds its way back to its owner's apartment, carrying the piece of Kramer's shirt. With the shirt scrap as evidence, police officers arrest Kramer, Newman and Elaine for dognapping. Elaine decides she needs to make some changes with her life.

Production
Writer/co-creator Larry David came up with the idea of George becoming engaged with the intent that it be a season-long story arc, but at the time had no plan for how the arc would be resolved. He wrote the first three episodes of the series in order to set the tone for the season.

The expression "Happy, Pappy?" was used by actress Heidi Swedberg in off-camera conversations with David. All the clips in the flashback montage of George and Susan's relationship were filmed specifically for this episode.

Actress Julia Louis-Dreyfus lost her voice overnight from doing the scene where Elaine shouts at the dog, so the writers worked her hoarseness into the episode's script.

Critical reception 

David Sims of The A.V. Club wrote, "The two-part (sorta) season opener to Seinfeld really feels like Larry David throwing down a marker. You know how last year was just generally a lot of fun, and had a little more broad, goofy comedy? ... For his last season on the show (he would return for the finale and continue to voice Steinbrenner) David goes back to the model he employed in seasons prior of having a loose arc for the year, and this time it's George getting married. The news is abrupt, shocking, and hilariously welcome. ... George is such a wreck by the end of that spectacle, it's hard not to pity him, stupid and impulsive as he may be."

Joanna L. Di Mattia, author of the essay "The Show About Something: Anxious Manhood and the Homosocial Order on Seinfeld," argues that "Susan Ross ... ultimately embodies the restrictions of marriage for George, and therefore a real threat to the male friendships on the show." This episode "illustrates how to approach marriage with the most inappropriate partner, solely for the purpose of personal reinforcement."

Vanity Fair put "The Engagement" at #106 in a ranking of all 180 episodes.

References

External links

Seinfeld (season 7) episodes
1995 American television episodes
Television episodes written by Larry David